Vriesea bituminosa is a plant species in the genus Vriesea, endemic to Brazil and Venezuela.

Distribution

The bromeliad is a native plant in Brazil and Venezuela.

Its range includes the Atlantic Forest biome (Mata Atlantica Brasileira), located in southeastern Brazil.

Cultivars
Garden cultivars include:
 Vriesea 'Exotica Jungle Tips'
 Vriesea 'Highway Beauty'

References

BSI Cultivar Registry Retrieved 11 October 2009

bituminosa
Flora of Brazil
Flora of Venezuela
Flora of the Atlantic Forest